The Flaming Mountains or Huoyan Mountains, are barren, eroded, red sandstone hills in the Tian Shan of Xinjiang. They lie near the northern rim of the Taklamakan Desert and east of the city of Turpan. Their striking gullies and trenches caused by erosion of the red sandstone bedrock give the mountains a flaming appearance at certain times of the day.

The mountain climate is harsh and the extremely high summer temperatures make this the hottest spot in China, frequently reaching  or higher. One of the largest thermometers in China is on display adjacent to the mountain, tracking the surrounding ground temperatures. It is a popular tourist spot.

A number of important palaeontological remains have been found in the area, see e.g. Lianmuqin Formation and Subashi Formation.

Silk route

In ancient times, the merchant traders traversing the Silk Route in Southeast Asia avoided the mountains by stopping at oasis towns, such as Gaochang, built on the desert's rim at the foot of the Flaming Mountains and  near an important mountain pass. Oasis towns became respite stops for traveling merchant traders.
Buddhist missionaries often accompanied traders on busy international trade routes. During this time trade boomed on the Silk Route. Buddhist monasteries and temples were built in the busy trading centers and in nearby remote mountain spots.

The Bezeklik Thousand Buddha Caves site lies in a gorge under the cliffs of the Flaming Mountains near the pass by Gaochang. It is a complex of seventy Buddhist cave grottoes dating from the 5th to the 9th centuries CE, many with thousands of murals of Buddha.

Literary fame
The Flaming Mountains received their name from a fantasy account of a Buddhist monk, accompanied by a Monkey King with magical powers. The monk runs into a wall of flames on his pilgrimage to India in the popular 16th century novel, Journey to the West, by Ming dynasty writer, Wu Cheng'en. The novel is an embellished description of the monk Xuanzang who traveled to India in 627 CE to obtain Buddhist scriptures and went through a pass in the Tien Shan after leaving Gaochang.

Mythology
According to the classical novel Journey to the West, the Monkey King created a disturbance in the heavens and knocked over a kiln belonging to Laozi, causing embers to fall from the sky to the place where the Flaming Mountains are now. 

The Princess Iron Fan possessed the magical Iron Fan, and used it to remove the fire on the  Flaming Mountains, though since she only fanned once each time, it would only able to be removed for a year, before the fire started again. The pilgrims encounter an extremely hostile range of volcanic mountains and can only pass if the volcanoes become inactive. Her fan, made from banana leaves, is extremely large and has magical properties, as it can create giant whirlwinds. Using this advantage, she made the residents near there revere her as their goddess, and they would have to give her some food if they want her to solve their problem about the Flaming Mountains.

In a Uighur legend, a dragon lived in the Tianshan Mountains. Because the dragon ate little children, a Uighur hero slew the dragon and cut it into eight pieces. The dragon's blood turned into a scarlet mountain of blood and the eight pieces became the eight valleys in the Flaming Mountains.

Climate

Footnotes

External links

Photo of the Flaming Mountains
Xinjiang
Gaochang
Xinjiang is home to 47 ethnic groups
Xinjiang Guide 
The Bezeklik Grottoes in the Flaming Mountains near Turpan - Photo

Turpan
Landforms of Xinjiang
Sites along the Silk Road
Cliffs of China
Hills of China